Gim, Kim, or K’im (majuscule: Գ; minuscule: գ; Armenian: գիմ) is the third letter of the Armenian alphabet, representing the voiced velar plosive in Eastern Armenian and the aspirated voiceless velar plosive in Western Armenian. It is typically romanized with the letter G. It was part of the alphabet created by Mesrop Mashtots in the 5th century CE. In the Armenian numeral system, it has a value of 3.

Character codes

See also
 Ben, the letter preceding Gim in the Armenian alphabet
 Armenian alphabet

References

External links
 Գ on Wiktionary
 գ on Wiktionary

Armenian letters